Andrew John Clarke may refer to:
Andrew Clarke (cricketer, born 1975) (born Andrew John Clarke), English cricketer
Andy C (born Andrew John Clarke), English DJ

See also
Andrew Clarke (disambiguation)